Kotputli is a city and municipal corporation in Kotputli-Behror district of Rajasthan, India, located between Jaipur city and New Delhi.On 17 March 2023 kotputli was made a district. The nearby areas like Patan, Narehda both villages belonged to the Marwari business family before they were merged into a single district. Kotputli has many historic temples and schools. It was historically a part of the Khetri Riyasat (now Alwar) kingdom, whose capital was at the nearby village of Bairath(Virat nagar) during the Mahabharata period.

Kotpuli's economy has blossomed in recent years due to large infrastructure projects. For example, Sardar School and Sardar Zanana Hospital were made by local bodies in conjunction with the Morijawala and Tijoriwala  family. Since then, numerous schools and hospitals have been built in Kotputli. 'desi ka dum' is famous youtube channel in Kotputli

History 
A municipality was established at Kotputli in 1892. Daksh jangid 
Class 4th

Organizations
Educational:Kotputli is home to many government and non-government higher education institutions, including NIMT Mahila B.Ed College (Offering B.Ed), NIMT Technical and Professional Colleges (Offering BA, BSc, BCom, LLB, BALLB), NIMT Institute of Management (Offering PGDM), Lal Bahadur Shastri Government PG College, Smt Pannadevi Morijawala Government Girls College, Choudhary T T College, Shri Krishna PG Law College, Tagore PG Law College, and Hans Law College  And Pristine Career Institute (for NEETand IIT-JEE).

Population
Kotputli town alone has a population of 18,202 as of the 2011 Census of India, with 10,051 males and 8,151 females.The population of Tehsil Kotputli according to the 2011 Census is 49,153 with 26,058 males and 23,094 females.amd according to 2023 the population of kotputli district is 65000

Demographics
The population of Kotputli was 52.7% male and 47.3% female as of the 2011 census. When asked about religious preference, 97.6% of the region identified as Hindu and 2.0% as Muslim, with Christians, Sikhs, and Jains making up the remaining population. Kotputli has an average literacy rate of 60.6%, slightly higher than the national average of 59.5%; male literacy is 71.5%, and female literacy is 48.6%. 88.1% of the population lives in the city, while 11.9% live in rural areas. 15.5% of the population is under six years of age.

Geography and climate

References

Cities and towns in Jaipur district